October Sky is a 1999 American biographical drama film directed by Joe Johnston and starring Jake Gyllenhaal, Chris Cooper, Chris Owen, and Laura Dern. The screenplay by Lewis Colick, based on the memoir of the same name, tells the true story of Homer H. Hickam Jr., a coal miner's son who was inspired by the launch of Sputnik 1 in 1957 to take up rocketry against his father's wishes and eventually became a NASA engineer.

October Sky is based on the lives of four young men who grew up in Coalwood, West Virginia. Principal photography took place in rural East Tennessee, including Oliver Springs, Harriman and Kingston in Morgan and Roane counties. The film was a moderate box office success and received very positive critical reception; it continues to be celebrated in the regions of its setting and filming.

Title
October Sky is an anagram of Rocket Boys, the title of the 1998 memoir upon which the film is based. It is also used in a period radio broadcast describing Sputnik 1 as it crossed the "October Sky". Homer Hickam said that "Universal Studios marketing people got involved and they just had to change the title because, according to their research, women over thirty would never see a movie titled Rocket Boys." The book was later re-released with the name in order to capitalize on interest in the film.

Plot
In October 1957, news of the Soviet Union's launch of Sputnik 1 reaches the town of Coalwood, West Virginia, where most male residents work in the coal mines. As the townspeople gather outside to see the satellite orbit across the sky, Homer Hickam is inspired to build his own rockets to escape the tedium of Coalwood. His family and classmates do not respond kindly, especially his father John, the mine superintendent, who wants Homer to join him in the mines.

Homer teams up with math geek Quentin Wilson, who shares an interest in aerospace engineering; with the support of friends Roy Lee Cooke and Sherman O'Dell, and their science teacher at Big Creek High School, Miss Freida J. Riley, the four construct small rockets. While their first launches fail, they experiment with new fuels and designs and eventually succeed. Though the local paper runs a story about the boys, they are accused of starting a wildfire with a stray rocket and are arrested. After John picks up Homer, Roy Lee is beaten by his abusive stepfather, Vernon. John intervenes and rescues Roy Lee, warning Vernon that he will protect Roy Lee as Roy Lee's late father would have.

In the aftermath of the arrest, the boys are dejected and abandon rocketry, destroying their launch site. In a mining accident, John is injured rescuing others, and Ike Bykovsky (a mine worker who let Homer use the machine shop for fabricating rocket components, and later transferred underground for better pay) is killed. Homer drops out of high school to work in the mine and provide for his family while his father recovers.

Later, Homer is inspired by Miss Riley to read a book on applied rocket science, learning to calculate the trajectory of a rocket. Using this, he and Quentin locate their missing rocket and prove it could not have caused the fire. The boys present their findings to Miss Riley and the school principal, Mr. Turner, who determines the cause was a flare from a nearby airfield. Homer returns to school by special invitation; the boys return to rocketry and win the school science fair. When the opportunity arises for one of them to participate in the National Science Fair in Indianapolis, they elect Homer.

The miner's union goes on strike against the coal company, angering John. While the family eats dinner, Vernon shoots into the kitchen but misses John, who dismisses his family's fears, leading to a heated argument with Homer. With the mines set to close and resenting his father's pressures, Homer storms out of the house, vowing never to return.

At the national science fair, Homer's display is well-received, and he enjoys popularity and some sightseeing. Overnight, someone steals his machined rocket part model – the de Laval nozzle – and his autographed picture of Dr. Wernher von Braun. Homer makes an urgent phone call home to his mother Elsie, who implores John to end the ongoing strike so that Mr. Bolden, Bykovsky's replacement, can use the machine shop to build a replacement nozzle. John relents when Elsie, fed up with his lack of support for their son, threatens to leave him. With the town's support and replacement parts quickly sent to Indianapolis by bus, the boys win the top prize and Homer is bombarded with college scholarship offers. He is also congratulated by Von Braun himself, though not realizing his idol's identity.

Homer returns to Coalwood as a hero and visits Miss Riley, who is dying of Hodgkin's lymphoma. At the launch of their largest rocket yet – the Miss Riley – John, who never attended any of the launchings, shows up at the last moment and is given the honor of pushing the launch button. The Miss Riley reaches an altitude of  – higher than the summit of Mount Everest. As the town looks up to the skies, John slowly puts his hand on Homer's shoulder and smiles, finally showing Homer that he is proud of him.

An epilogue, using home movie footage, reveals the real-life outcomes of the main characters' lives.

Cast

Production
Filming began on February 23, 1998, almost a year before the movie's release. Although the film takes place in West Virginia, Tennessee was the location of choice for filming in part because of the weather and area terrain. Film crews reconstructed the sites to look like the 1957 mining town setting the movie demanded. The weather of east Tennessee gave the filmmakers trouble and delayed production of the film. Cast and crew recalled the major weather shifts and tornadoes in the area during the filming months but Joe Johnston claims, "ultimately, the movie looks great because of it. It gave the film a much more interesting and varied look." The crews also recreated a mine for the underground scenes. Johnston expressed that he felt that the appearance of the mine in the film gave it an evil look, like the mine was the villain in the film and felt it ironic because that is what gave the town its nourishment. More than 2000 extras were used in the movie. A small switching yard allowed the filmmakers and actors to film the scenes with the boys on the railroad and gave them freedom to do as they pleased, even tear apart tracks. The locomotive used in the scene was Southern Railway 4501 re-lettered as Norfolk and Western No. 4501. Filming concluded on April 30, 1998.

The film's star, Jake Gyllenhaal, was 17 years old during filming, the same as Homer Hickam's character. In an interview in 2014, Natalie Canerday recalled that Gyllenhaal was tutored on set because he was still in school and taking advanced classes.

Release
October Sky opened on February 19, 1999 in 1,495 theaters and had an opening weekend gross of $5,905,250. At its widest theater release, 1,702 theaters were showing the movie. The movie has had a total lifetime gross of $34,675,800 worldwide.

Reception

Critical reception
October Sky received generally positive reviews. Review aggregator Rotten Tomatoes reports that 91% out of 74 critics gave the film a positive review, with a rating average of 7.6/10. The critic's consensus states: "Rich in sweet sincerity, intelligence, and good old-fashioned inspirational drama, October Sky is a coming-of-age story with a heart to match its Hollywood craftsmanship." Metacritic gave the film a score of 71 out of 100 based on reviews from 23 critics, indicating "generally favorable reviews". Audiences surveyed by CinemaScore gave the film a grade "A" on scale of A to F.

Many critics tend to commend the movie for its values, family, and inspirational aspects. A lot of reviews focus on the main character's relationship with his father and on the actors' performances. Roger Ebert, who gave the film three-and-a-half stars out of four, recognized that the film "doesn't simplify the father into a bad guy or a tyrant. He understandably wants his son to follow in his footsteps, and one of the best elements of the movie is in breaking free, he is respecting his father. This movie has deep values."

James Wall of The Christian Century describes the film's concentration on the father-son relationship as "at times painful to watch. There are no winners or losers when sons go their separate ways. October Sky does not illustrate good parenting; rather, it evokes the realization that since parents have only a limited vision of how to shape their children's future, the job requires a huge amount of love and a lot of divine assistance."  However, some reviews, such as one from Entertainment Weekly and TV Guide, claim that the movie's highlight was the acting of Jake Gyllenhaal and Chris Cooper.

A review in the Christian Science Monitor points out that some viewers may question “the movie's hero-worshiping treatment of Homer's role model, Wernher von Braun, who's depicted as an all-American icon with no acknowledgment of his earlier career in Nazi Germany.” During World War II, Braun was a member of the Nazi party and the Allgemeine SS. In addition, the ballistic weapons that he developed for the Nazi regime were largely constructed by concentration camp prisoners who faced inhumane conditions, with many dying due to their brutal imprisonment.

Accolades
October Sky won three awards, including: OCIC Award for Joe Johnston at the Ajijic International Film Festival 1999, the Critics' Choice Movie Awards for Best Family Film from the Broadcast Film Critics Association in 2000, and a Humanitas Prize 1999 for Featured Film Category.

The film is recognized by American Film Institute in these lists:
 2006: AFI's 100 Years...100 Cheers – Nominated

Differences between the film and book
The movie was praised for its portrayal of 1950s Appalachia despite several major and minor differences from the book on which it is based.
 Homer Hickam is the main character's name; in the book and in real life he was nicknamed "Sonny".
 Homer Hickam Jr.'s father was not named John. This was changed in an effort to keep the audience from being confused.
 There were actually six "rocket boys" rather than the four in the movie. Some of the movie's representations of the characters are combinations of the real-life boys. Their names were: Homer Hickam Jr., Quentin Wilson, Jimmy O'Dell Carroll, Roy Lee Cooke, Billy Rose and Sherman Siers.
 The Rocket Boys did not steal railroad parts as in the film; however, they did attempt to grab a cast iron pipe under the tracks and, according to Homer's website, this almost got him killed.
 While the boys were accused of starting a fire, they were never detained. The police soon realized that their rockets could not have traveled over 3 miles and the boys were exonerated. Homer never had to prove their innocence, as his character did in the film.
 Homer never dropped out of school to work in the town's mine. He did, however, work in the mine the following summer, as described in Hickam's book Sky of Stone.
 Homer never met Wernher von Braun - as it turns out, von Braun was looking for the Rocket Boys’ exhibit when Homer was looking for him; and they missed each other.

Cultural impact
There are two annual festivals in honor of the Rocket Boys and the film. One is held in West Virginia where the real-life events depicted in the book and film took place, and the other is in Tennessee where the movie was actually shot. The Rocket Boys often visit the festival in West Virginia, which is also called the "Rocket Boys Festival", while the festival in Tennessee focuses more on the filming locations. The Tennessee festival's site claims that the festival is "a celebration of our heritage."

Jeff Bezos, the billionaire founder of Amazon, saw a screening of October Sky in 1999. In a subsequent conversation with the science fiction writer Neal Stephenson, Bezos commented that he had always wanted to start a space company. Stephenson urged him to do so. Bezos then started the private aerospace manufacturing and services company Blue Origin, and Stephenson became one of the company's early employees.

References

External links

 Homer Hickam's Official Website
 Information and Photos of Filming Locations
 Photo gallery from the filming of October Sky in East Tennessee
 
 
 
 October Sky at The Numbers

1999 films
1990s coming-of-age drama films
1990s biographical drama films
American teen drama films
American coming-of-age drama films
American biographical drama films
Biographical films about scientists
Cultural depictions of engineers
1990s English-language films
Cold War films
Films based on biographies
Films about technology
Films directed by Joe Johnston
Films produced by Charles Gordon
Films set in 1957
Films set in Appalachia
Films set in mining communities
Films set in West Virginia
Films shot in Tennessee
Universal Pictures films
Model rocketry
Films scored by Mark Isham
1999 drama films
American children's drama films
Films about father–son relationships
1990s American films